María de la Luz Colín González (born March 7, 1966) is a retired female race walker from Mexico.

Personal bests
10 km: 45:33 min –  Saint Léonard, 3 October 1986

Achievements

References

1966 births
Living people
Mexican female racewalkers
Athletes (track and field) at the 1987 Pan American Games
Pan American Games medalists in athletics (track and field)
Pan American Games gold medalists for Mexico
Central American and Caribbean Games gold medalists for Mexico
Competitors at the 1986 Central American and Caribbean Games
Competitors at the 1993 Central American and Caribbean Games
Central American and Caribbean Games medalists in athletics
Medalists at the 1987 Pan American Games
20th-century Mexican women